Daniel Betancur (born 16 October 1995) is a male recurve archer from Colombia. He competed at the 2015 World Archery Championships in Copenhagen, Denmark as well as the 2015 World Archery Youth Championships in Yankton, South Dakota.

References

External links 
 Archery GB - It's bronze for Britain!
 Archery World Cup 2015 Stage 4
 Huston V Betancur - Recurve Junior Men's 2R | Yankton 2015
 World Archery Daniel Betancur Statistics
 Athlete Profile: Toronto 2015

Colombian male archers
Archers at the 2015 Pan American Games
Archers at the 2019 Pan American Games
Pan American Games competitors for Colombia
Living people
1995 births
Place of birth missing (living people)
Central American and Caribbean Games silver medalists for Colombia
Competitors at the 2014 Central American and Caribbean Games
Central American and Caribbean Games gold medalists for Colombia
Central American and Caribbean Games medalists in archery
21st-century Colombian people